Pont-rhyd-y-groes (also known as Pontrhydygroes) is a village near Cwm Ystwyth and Pont ar Fynach (Devil's Bridge), in Ceredigion, Wales. The village takes its name from the bridge and (earlier) ford over the River Ystwyth.

The area used to be dominated by the mining industry, in particular by the Lisburnes. The miners' bridge across the Ystwyth gorge and the waterfall have been rebuilt.

The remnants of the Fron Goch mines, which mined lead and zinc from ca. 1760 until ca. 1903, are situated approximately  miles ( km) north of the village.

Notable people 
Beth Robert, Welsh TV actress since 1986.

References

External links

Jenkinson's Practical Guide to North Wales
www.geograph.co.uk : Photos of Pont rhyd y groes and surrounding area
Description of the Fron Goch Mine from a book by David Bick
Description of the Fron Goch Mine on www.aditnow.co.uk
Description of the Fron Goch Mine on coflein.gov.uk

Villages in Ceredigion